Douglas Steven Lavine (born December 9, 1950) is a Judge of the Connecticut Appellate Court.

Education

Lavine graduated from Colgate University in 1972 with a degree in history. He then earned a master's degree in journalism from the Columbia University Graduate School of Journalism. After he received his Juris Doctor from the University of Connecticut School of Law in 1977, he earned a Master of Laws from Columbia Law School in 1981. Lavine worked as a newspaper reporter and editor prior to his legal career.

Journalism and legal careers

He was a reporter and editor for various newspapers before entering into his legal career. He worked in the Litigation Department of the Hartford law firm of Shipman & Goodwin from 1981 to 1986. He served as an Assistant United States Attorney from 1986 to 1993. In 1993, Governor Lowell P. Weicker Jr. appointed him to be a Superior Court judge. He was reappointed by Governor John G. Rowland in 2001. In February 2006, he was elevated to the Connecticut Appellate Court by Governor Jodi Rell. He was most recently renominated by Governor Dan Malloy and confirmed by the Connecticut General Assembly for another eight-year term, expiring on March 14, 2022.

Teaching
He has taught as an adjunct professor at the University of Connecticut School of Law and Quinnipiac University School of Law.

Personal life
A resident of West Hartford, Lavine is the author of two books on advocacy. His wife, Lucretia, is a social worker and his daughter, Julia, also a graduate of the University of Connecticut School of Law, is a practicing lawyer in Hartford.

References

External links
Official Biography on State of Connecticut Judicial Branch website

Living people
1950 births
20th-century American judges
20th-century American lawyers
21st-century American judges
Colgate University alumni
Columbia Law School alumni
Columbia University Graduate School of Journalism alumni
Connecticut lawyers
Judges of the Connecticut Appellate Court
Superior court judges in the United States
University of Connecticut School of Law alumni